German submarine U-368 was a Type VIIC U-boat of Nazi Germany's Kriegsmarine during World War II.

She carried out no patrols. She did not sink or damage any ships.

She was sunk after Germany's surrender as part of Operation Deadlight on 17 December 1945.

Design
German Type VIIC submarines were preceded by the shorter Type VIIB submarines. U-368 had a displacement of  when at the surface and  while submerged. She had two shafts and two  propellers.

U-368 was fitted with five  torpedo tubes (four fitted at the bow and one at the stern), fourteen torpedoes, one  SK C/35 naval gun, 220 rounds, and two twin  C/30 anti-aircraft guns. The boat had a complement of between forty-four and sixty.

Service history
The submarine was laid down on 20 August 1942 at the Flensburger Schiffbau-Gesellschaft yard at Flensburg as yard number 491, launched on 16 November 1943 and commissioned on 7 January 1944 under the command of Oberleutnant zur See Wolfgang Schäfer.

She served with the 21st U-boat Flotilla from 7 January 1944 and the 31st flotilla from 1 March 1945.

Fate
U-368 surrendered at the German-occupied island of Heligoland on 5 May 1945. She moved to Wilhelmshaven and was transferred to Loch Ryan in Scotland for Operation Deadlight on 23 June. She was sunk by naval gunfire on 17 December.

References

Bibliography

External links

German Type VIIC submarines
U-boats commissioned in 1943
U-boats sunk in 1945
1943 ships
Ships built in Flensburg
Operation Deadlight
World War II submarines of Germany
Maritime incidents in December 1945